Pannonia Inferior, lit. Lower Pannonia, was a province of the Roman Empire. Its capital was Sirmium. It was one of the border provinces on the Danube. It was formed in the year 103 AD by Emperor Trajan who divided the former province of Pannonia into two parts: Pannonia Superior and Pannonia Inferior. The province included parts of present-day states of Hungary, Serbia, Croatia, and Bosnia and Herzegovina. The province was bordered to the east (across the Danube) by a Sarmatian tribe—the Iazyges. Later, the Vandals appeared to the north-east.

Settlements

Major settlements in Pannonia Inferior included:
 Sirmium (Sremska Mitrovica) which several times served as an imperial residence for several emperors.
 Aquincum (Buda), the provincial capital.
 Cuccium (Ilok)
 Cibalae (Vinkovci)
 Mursa (Osijek)
 Certissa (Đakovo)
 Marsonia (Slavonski Brod)
 Sopianae (Pécs)

Aftermath and legacy
The province was yet again split during the reign of the tetrarchs into two more provinces, Pannonia Valeria in the north, with the new provincial capital at Sopianae, and Pannonia Secunda in the south with Sirmium as the provincial capital. During the Frankish period, in the 9th century, the term Lower Pannonia was used to designate eastern and southern regions of Pannonia, including the Slavic Principality of Lower Pannonia, particularly Posavina.

List of Roman governors 
 Publius Aelius Hadrianus 106-108
 Titus Julius Maximus Manlianus 108-110/111
 Publius Afranius Flavianus 111/112-114/115
 Quintus Marcius Turbo 117/118-118/119
 Lucius Cornelius Latinianus ?127-130
 Lucius Attius Macro 130/131-133/134
 Nonius Mucianus 134-136
 Lucius Aelius Caesar 136-137
 Claudius Maximus 137-c. 141
 Marcus Pontius Laelianus Larcius Sabinus c. 141-c. 144
 Quintus Fuficius Cornutus c. 144-147
 Marcus Cominius Secundus 147-c. 150
 Marcus Nonius Macrinus c. 150-c. 153
 Marcus Iallius Bassus Fabius Valerianus c. 156-c. 159
 Gaius Julius Geminius Capellianus c. 159-c. 161
 Tiberius Haterius Saturninus c. 161-164
 Tiberius Claudius Pompeianus c. 167
 Lucius Ulpius Marcellus before 173
 Gaius Vettius Sabinianus Julius Hospes c. 173-175
 Sextus Quintilius Condianus c. 175-c. 179
 Lucius Septimius Flaccus c. 179-c. 183
 Lucius Cornelius Felix Plotianus c. 183-185
 Gaius Pomponius Bassus Terentianus 192
 Gaius Valerius Pudens c. 192-c. 194
 Tiberius Claudius Claudianus c. 197/198
 Lucius Baebius Caecilianus 199-202
 Lucius Cassius Marcellinus between 202 and 204
 Gaius Julius Septimius Castinus c. 211/212
 Gaius Octavius Appius Suetonius Sabinus c. 215/216
 Lucius Alfenus Avitianus between 218 and 222
 Marcius Claudius Agrippa c. 217
 Triccianus 217-218
 Pontius Proculus Pontianus c. 219-222
 Flavius Aelianus c. 228
 Iasdius Domitianus between 222 and 235
 Flavius Marcianus between 230 and 235
 Lucius Ulpius Marcellus c.262-c.264

See also
Pannoni
Pannonia
Pannonia Secunda
Pannonia Valeria
Diocese of Pannonia

References

Sources

External links
Roman Empire - Pannonia
Pannonia Inferior - Map

 
Illyricum (Roman province)
Serbia in the Roman era
History of Syrmia
Ancient history of Vojvodina
Croatia in the Roman era
Geographic history of Croatia
Hungary in the Roman era
Bosnia and Herzegovina in the Roman era
States and territories established in the 100s
Inferior
100s establishments in the Roman Empire
290s disestablishments in the Roman Empire
100s establishments
3rd-century disestablishments